Chiraguz or Jrakus is a village in the Khojavend District of Azerbaijan, in the disputed region of Nagorno-Karabakh. The village had an Armenian-majority population prior to the 2020 Nagorno-Karabakh war, and also had an Armenian majority in 1989.

History 
During the Soviet period, the village was part of the Hadrut District of the Nagorno-Karabakh Autonomous Oblast. After the First Nagorno-Karabakh War, the village was administrated as part of the Hadrut Province of the breakaway Republic of Artsakh. The village came under the control of Azerbaijan on 15 October 2020, during the 2020 Nagorno-Karabakh war.

Historical heritage sites 
Historical heritage sites in and around the village include a 12th/13th-century khachkar and spring monument, a cemetery from between the 16th and 19th centuries, St. Stephen's Church built in 1698, and the monastery of Kavakavank built in 1742.

Demographics 
The village had 233 inhabitants in 2005, and 238 inhabitants in 2015.

References

Notes

Citations

External links 
 

Populated places in Hadrut Province
Populated places in Khojavend District
Nagorno-Karabakh
Former Armenian inhabited settlements